Lishui Town is a town in Nanhai District, Foshan, Guangdong, China.

References

Link
Official website of Lishui Town, Nanhai, Foshan (Chinese)

Nanhai District
Towns in Guangdong